The Foster Pavilion is a multi-purpose arena currently under construction on the campus of Baylor University in Waco, Texas. Construction began in June 2022, with completion estimated for January 2024. The arena will replace the Ferrell Center for the Baylor men's and women's basketball teams, while the Ferrell Center will be renovated as a home for volleyball and acrobatics and tumbling teams.

History
The arena was first announced in 2019, as a basketball-only facility, with a lead funding gift from an anonymous donor of $100 million. In November 2021, the anonymous donors were revealed as Paul L. Foster and his wife Alejandra, and it was announced that the arena would be named the Foster Pavilion in their honor. The following month, it was announced that the arena would be built as part of a new, $700 million multi-use development along the Brazos River in downtown Waco, across Interstate 35 from the University's campus. Alongside this, it was announced that the City of Waco would provide an additional $65 million in funding, which would be used to add elements to the arena to allow its use as a city-run concert venue 90 days per year.

References

Indoor arenas under construction in the United States
Baylor Bears basketball